Raggare! (in the UK released as Blackjackets) is a Swedish drama film which was released to cinemas in Sweden on 13 November 1959, directed by Olle Hellbom.

Plot
A gang of car driving youngsters (raggare) hang out in a café outside Stockholm. The coolest among the youngsters, Roffe, kidnaps his girlfriend when discovering that she hangs out with guys from another gang.

Cast 
Christina Schollin – Beatrice ”Bibban” Larsson
Bill Magnusson – Roffe 
Hans Wahlgren – Lasse
Svenerik Perzon – Lankan 
Sven Almgren – Svenne
Lasse Starck – Svennes kompis
Anita Wall – Annemarie 
Britta Brunius – fru Larsson
Inga Botorp – Ninae
Eva Engström – Eva
Sven Holmberg – herr Larsson
Tommy Johnson – Pipan
Toivo Pawlo – Flintis dönicke
Håkan Serner – Sven-Erik

References

External links 

1959 films
1959 drama films
Swedish drama films
1950s Swedish-language films
Films directed by Olle Hellbom
1950s Swedish films